Christer Persson (born 11 October 1979) is a retired Swedish footballer who played as a midfielder. He is the sporting director of Jönköpings Södra IF.

References

External links
 
 
 

1979 births
Living people
Association football midfielders
Swedish footballers
Allsvenskan players
Superettan players
Kalmar FF players
FK Tønsberg players
Pors Grenland players
Jönköpings Södra IF players
Expatriate footballers in Norway